Suleiman Cassamo (born 2 November 1962 in Marracuene) is a Mozambican writer. He is a member of Associação dos Escritores Moçambicanos.

He studied Mechanical engineering and has published in Charrua, Gazeta de Artes e Letras, Eco, Forja and  Notícias.

Works 
O regresso do morto, 1987
Amor de Baobá, 1997
Palestra para Um Morto, 1999

Awards
Prémio Guimarães Rosa, Radio France Internacionale:O Caminho de Phati (1994).

Sources and external links
Associação dos Escritores Moçambicanos Contracapa da obra O regresso do morto
Biblioteca Nacional de Portugal Porbase

External links
 Lusofonia.com.sapo.pt

1962 births
People from Maputo Province
Living people
Mozambican writers